Platycrossos is a genus of protocoleopteran beetles in the family Permosynidae. Fossils of this genus have been recovered from Late Jurassic sediments in Mongolia.

Species
After: 
 Platycrossos caroli  – Lunz Formation, Austria, Late Triassic (Carnian)
 Platycrossos elongatus  – Itat Formation, Russia, Middle Jurassic (Bajocian/Bathonian)
 Platycrossos latus  – Sharteg Formation, Mongolia, Late Jurassic (Tithonian)
 Platycrossos ligulatus  – Blackstone Formation, Australia, Late Triassic (Norian)
 Platycrossos longus  – Sharteg Formation, Mongolia, Late Jurassic (Tithonian)
 Platycrossos loxonicus  – Sharteg Formation, Mongolia, Late Jurassic (Tithonian)
 Platycrossos mongolicus  – Sharteg Formation, Mongolia, Late Jurassic (Tithonian)
 Platycrossos ovum  – Sharteg Formation, Mongolia, Late Jurassic (Tithonian)
 Platycrossos petalus  – Itat Formation, Russia, Middle Jurassic (Bajocian/Bathonian)
 Platycrossos punctatus  – Itat Formation, Russia, Middle Jurassic (Bajocian/Bathonian)
 Platycrossos subtumidus  – Blackstone Formation, Australia, Late Triassic (Norian)
 Platycrossos tumidus  – Blackstone Formation, Australia, Late Triassic (Norian)

References

P
Fossil taxa described in 1923
Prehistoric beetle genera